Para El Pueblo is the twenty-sixth studio album by La Mafia released on November 16, 2004.

Track listing

References

2004 albums
La Mafia albums
Spanish-language albums